Poncha Pass (9,010 ft/2,745 m) is a mountain pass in South-Central Colorado (USA). It lies between the San Luis Valley to the south and the valley of the Arkansas River to the north, and is one of the lowest mountain passes in the state. It is in the saddle between the Sangre de Cristo Range, lying to the southeast, and the Sawatch Range, lying to the west and northwest. The small town of Poncha Springs lies about 6 miles (9 km) north of the pass. The pass has a mild approach on the northern side and a moderate 5% approach from the south, though it remains open all year round and does not normally cause problems for vehicles in winter.

Poncha Pass lies on the border between Chaffee County and Saguache County, and on the border between the San Isabel National Forest and the Rio Grande National Forest.

Transport routes 

 U.S. Highway 285 presently runs over the pass, linking the cities of Alamosa to the south and Salida to the northeast. 
 Until 1951, a 3 ft (914 mm) narrow-gauge rail line operated by the Denver & Rio Grand Western Railroad ran over the pass linking Mears Junction to the north with Alamosa to the south.

References

External links
 Poncha Pass at CyclePass.com

Landforms of Chaffee County, Colorado
Mountain passes of Colorado
Denver and Rio Grande Western Railroad
Landforms of Saguache County, Colorado
Transportation in Chaffee County, Colorado
Transportation in Saguache County, Colorado
U.S. Route 285
Rail mountain passes of the United States